Ian David Schuback  (born 4 September 1952) is a former Australian lawn and indoor bowler.

Biography
Schuback bowled for the Coolangatta club in Queensland and was also a former professional tennis coach.

He started bowling in 1980 after watching the Melbourne World Outdoor Championships. Schuback claimed a Men's Singles silver medal at the 1986 Commonwealth Games and then won the 1988 World Indoor Bowls Championship and the 1990 Commonwealth Games Pairs titles.

He won the 1992 World Indoor Bowls Championships Singles, the 1994 World Indoor Bowls Championship Pairs and the 1996 World Indoor Bowls Championship Pairs.

He won two silver medals at the 1991 Asia Pacific Bowls Championships, in Kowloon, Hong Kong.

References

Australian male bowls players
Living people
1952 births
Commonwealth Games medallists in lawn bowls
Commonwealth Games gold medallists for Australia
Commonwealth Games silver medallists for Australia
Recipients of the Medal of the Order of Australia
Recipients of the Australian Sports Medal
Indoor Bowls World Champions
Bowls players at the 1986 Commonwealth Games
Bowls players at the 1990 Commonwealth Games
Medallists at the 1986 Commonwealth Games
Medallists at the 1990 Commonwealth Games